WUTM (90.3 FM) is a radio station  broadcasting a contemporary hit radio format. Licensed to Martin, Tennessee, United States, the station serves the University of Tennessee at Martin campus.  The station is currently owned by The University of Tennessee.

References

External links

UTM
UTM